Grove Lake is a lake in Pope County, in the U.S. state of Minnesota.

Grove Lake was named for a grove of trees near the lake shore.

See also
List of lakes in Minnesota

References

Lakes of Minnesota
Lakes of Pope County, Minnesota